The 2014 Pro Mazda Winterfest was the first winter series of the 16-year-old championship. It consisted of four races held during two race meets and was run alongside the 2014 U.S. F2000 Winterfest and Indy Lights series tests.

American Spencer Pigot scored two poles, four fastest-laps and two wins on his way to the championship. A controversial race start in race two gave Canadian Garett Grist the win in race two and fellow Canadian rookie Scott Hargrove won round four. Hargrove and Grist finished second and third in points, respectively. Rookies Shelby Blackstock and Pipo Derani also recorded podium finishes and finished fourth and fifth in points.

Drivers and teams

Race calendar and results
The series schedule, along with the other Road to Indy series', was announced on October 24, 2013.

Championship standings

Drivers'

 Drivers must complete 50% race distance to score main points, otherwise 1 point is awarded.

Teams'

References

External links
 Pro Mazda Championship Official website

Indy Pro 2000 Championship
Pro Mazda Winterfest
Pro Mazda Winterfest
Pro Mazda Winterfest